Harry Kypros Kyprianou (born 16 March 1997) is a Cypriot footballer who plays as a full-back or winger for Weymouth.

Club career
Kyprianou joined Southend United in September 2015 after a successful trial with the club.

He made his debut for Southend on 30 August, scoring in the 2–0 win in the 2016–17 EFL Trophy against Brighton & Hove Albion U23's.

On 23rd October 2020, Kyprianou joined  Bromley on a short-term loan. 

He was released by Southend in the summer of 2021 following their relegation from the English Football League to the National League. He subsequently signed for National League South side Oxford City in September 2021.

In July 2022, Kyprianou signed for recently relegated National League South club Weymouth.

International career
Kyprianou debuted with the Cyprus national under-21 football team in a 4-0 2019 UEFA European Under-21 Championship qualification loss to Hungary U21 on 22 March 2018.

Style of play
Southend United manager Phil Brown stated that Kyprianou "can play at left-back, on the left wing and also on the left hand side of three centre-backs" and claimed "he covers plenty of positions".

Career statistics

References

External links
Southend United profile

1997 births
Living people
People from Enfield, London
Cypriot footballers
Cyprus youth international footballers
English footballers
English people of Greek Cypriot descent
Association football defenders
Association football midfielders
English Football League players
National League (English football) players
Watford F.C. players
Southend United F.C. players
Lowestoft Town F.C. players
Bromley F.C. players
Oxford City F.C. players
Weymouth F.C. players